The following is a list of all light rail systems in the United States, ranked by ridership.  Also included are those urban streetcar/trolley systems that are providing regular public transit service (i.e. operating year-round and at least five days/week). This list does not include statistics for metro/rapid transit systems (see: the List of United States rapid transit systems by ridership for those). Daily and annual ridership figures are based on "average weekday unlinked passenger trips" (where transfers between lines are counted as two separate passenger "boardings" or "trips"). The annual ridership figures for 2019 and average weekday ridership figures for the fourth quarter (Q4) of 2019 come from the American Public Transportation Association's (APTA) Ridership Reports statistics for the fourth quarter (Q4) of 2019, unless otherwise noted (e.g. NJ Transit systems).  References with supplementary (i.e. non-APTA) ridership figures are included in the System column.

List

Gallery

Systems excluded from ridership table 

The following light rail systems have been excluded from the ridership table above:

See also 

 Light rail in the United States
 Light rail
 List of North American light rail systems by ridership
 Light rail in North America
 Streetcars in North America
 List of tram and light rail transit systems
 List of rail transit systems in the United States
 List of United States rapid transit systems by ridership
 List of North American rapid transit systems by ridership
 List of Latin American rail transit systems by ridership
 List of United States commuter rail systems by ridership
 List of United States local bus agencies by ridership
 Public transportation

Notes

References 

Rail systems by ridership